Peter Dumont Vroom (December 12, 1791 – November 18, 1873), an American Democratic Party politician, served as the ninth governor of New Jersey (serving two terms in office; from 1829–1832 and 1833–1836) and as a member of the United States House of Representatives for a single term, from 1839–1841.

Early life 
He was born in Hillsborough Township, New Jersey the son of Col. Peter Dumont Vroom (1745-1831) who represented Somerset County as an Assemblyman (1790–91, 1794–96, and 1811–13) and in the Legislative Council from 1798 to 1804 as a Federalist. The younger Vroom graduated from Columbia College, New York in 1808. After studying law at Somerville Academy he was admitted to the bar in 1813.

Politics

Governorship of New Jersey
Vroom was a member of the New Jersey General Assembly from 1826 to 1829. He then served as governor of New Jersey from 1829 to 1832 and 1833 to 1836. As governor, Vroom supported the establishment of the Camden and Amboy Railroad and the Delaware and Raritan Canal.

Congress 
In 1838, Vroom was one of five Democratic candidates for Congress to become involved in the Broad Seal War controversy. Disputed election results caused the U.S. House of Representatives to challenge the Whig candidates certified by Governor William Pennington. After a lengthy fight, Vroom and the four other Democrats were seated in place of the Whigs. Vroom lost his bid for reelection in 1840.

Ministership 
He then served as a delegate to the New Jersey State Constitutional Convention in 1844. He was appointed by President Franklin Pierce as United States Minister to Prussia from November 4, 1853 through August 10, 1857.

Death 
Vroom died in Trenton, New Jersey and was buried in the Dumont Burying Ground off River Road in Hillsborough Township, New Jersey.

References

External links

https://web.archive.org/web/20110725005156/http://slic.njstatelib.org/slic_files/imported/NJ_Information/Digital_Collections/Governors_of_New_Jersey/GVROO.pdf biography of Governor Vroom at the New Jersey State Library
Political Graveyard information for Peter Dumont Vroom

1791 births
1873 deaths
Ambassadors of the United States to Prussia
Democratic Party governors of New Jersey
Democratic Party members of the United States House of Representatives from New Jersey
People from Hillsborough Township, New Jersey
Politicians from Somerset County, New Jersey
Columbia College (New York) alumni
American members of the Dutch Reformed Church
Reformed Church in America members
American people of Dutch descent
19th-century American diplomats
Burials in New Jersey
Democratic Party members of the New Jersey General Assembly
19th-century American politicians